Gijon Robinson (born October 12, 1984) is a former American football tight end and fullback. He was signed by the Indianapolis Colts of the National Football League as an undrafted free agent in 2007. He played college football at Missouri Western State. He currently resides in Fort Leonard Wood, Missouri and attended high school at Waynesville High School.

He was signed by the Jacksonville Jaguars on July 27, 2012 and later released on August 2.

He was released by the San Francisco 49ers on August 15, 2012.

References

External links
San Francisco 49ers bio
Jacksonville Jaguars bio

1984 births
Living people
People from Fort Leonard Wood, Missouri
Players of American football from Missouri
American football tight ends
American football fullbacks
Missouri Western Griffons football players
Indianapolis Colts players
Detroit Lions players